Zahid is a surname. Notable people with the surname include:

Agha Zahid (born 1953), Pakistani cricketer
Daanish Zahid, convicted of the racially motivated murder of Kriss Donald in Scotland
Mohammad Zahid (born 1976), Pakistani cricketer and coach